State Highway 12 (SH 12) is a State Highway in Kerala, India that starts in Ambalapuzha and ends in Thiruvalla. The highway is 27.2 km long.

Route description 
Ambalapuzha (NH 47) - Thakazhy - Thalavady - Podiyadi junction (Kayamkulam - Thiruvalla Highway SH 06) joins - Thiruvalla (MC Road)

See also 
Roads in Kerala
List of State Highways in Kerala

References 

State Highways in Kerala
Roads in Alappuzha district
Roads in Pathanamthitta district